Daniel Biveson (born 16 December 1976 in Lidingö, Stockholm County) is a Swedish snowboarder (Alpine). Biveson competes on the snowboard cross World Cup tour and has tallied 18 podium appearances and four World Cup wins. His first win was in 2001 in Ischgl, Austria.

Biveson has represented Sweden in Men's Parallel Giant Slalom at the 2002 Winter Olympics in Salt Lake City, at the 2006 Winter Olympics in Turin, and at the 2010 Winter Olympics in Vancouver. Both in Salt Lake City and Turin, as well as in Vancouver, he qualified for the elimination round but lost in the Round of 16, finishing 16th, 11th and 14th respectively.

His wife Aprilia Hägglöf is a former international snowboarder.

World Cup victories
FIS Snowboard World Cup victories: 4 (2 Parallel Slalom, 2 Parallel Giant Slalom).

References

External links
 International Ski Federation - Biography and results
 Daniel Biveson at Sports Reference
 http://www.theskichannel.com/athletes/Daniel-Biveson

1976 births
Living people
People from Lidingö Municipality
Swedish male snowboarders
Snowboarders at the 2002 Winter Olympics
Snowboarders at the 2006 Winter Olympics
Snowboarders at the 2010 Winter Olympics
Olympic snowboarders of Sweden
Sportspeople from Stockholm County
21st-century Swedish people